The Baker Museum (formerly the Naples Museum of Art) is part of Artis–Naples, a multidisciplinary organization that also is the home of the Naples Philharmonic, located at 5833 Pelican Bay Boulevard, Naples, Florida. The museum, opened in 2000, houses a diverse collection of art in a three-story,  facility. The permanent collection includes works of American modernism, 20th-century Mexican art, sculpture and 3-dimensional art. In addition to the permanent collection, the museum hosts traveling exhibits throughout the year. The Baker Museum also houses the Sisters Reading Room, which contains the Saldukas Family Foundation library collection.

Collection 
The museum's permanent collection is made up of over 3,500 objects of 20th- and 21st-century art, particularly American and Mexican modern art. The collection continues to grow through donations and museum purchases.

Ahmet Ertegun Collection 
The museum acquired the Ahmet Ertegun collection in 1999, which contains about 300 works of Modernist art from the 1910s through the 1960s. The collection has works by artists A. E. Gallatin, Morgan Russell, Marsden Hartley, Stanton Macdonald-Wright, Thomas

Hart Benton, Helen Torr, and Stuart Davis.

Harry Pollak Collection 
The museum acquired the Harry Pollack collection in 2002, which contains works of modern Mexican art dated from 1900 to 1980. Artists include Leonora Carrington, Diego Rivera, José Clemente Orozco, Rufino Tamayo, and David Alfaro Siqueiros.

Bryna Prensky Collection 
The museum was gifted the Bryna Prensky collection in 2007, which contains Mexican art from artists like Mario Rangel and Felipe Saúl Peña.

Olga Hirshhorn Collection 
The Olga Hirshhorn collection was acquired in 2013 and 2016, and contains a diverse collection of modern and contemporary art by artists such as Josef Albers, Alexander Calder, Georgia O'Keeffe, Man Ray, Willem de Kooning, Pablo Picasso, and Ed Ruscha.

Paul and Charlotte Corddry Collection 
The Paul and Charlotte Corddry collection was donated to the museum in 2016, and contains modern and contemporary art from American artists, including Robert Motherwell, Roy Lichtenstein, Marilyn Minter, Larry Rivers, Ed Moses, Viola Frey, James Rosenquist, Pat Steir, Frank Stella, John Wesley, Ellsworth Kelly, and Robert Rauschenberg.

Programming 
The Baker Museum hosts events including exhibition lectures, workshops, Art After Hours, and Artists' Studio Tour to celebrate the visual arts and lifelong learning. Every last Wednesday of the month from 6pm to 9pm, visitors to the museum for Art After Hours get free admission.

Building 
The Baker Museum closed for repairs in September 2017 due to water damage caused by Hurricane Irma. The museum reopened in December 2019 after two years of building repairs. The museum is undergoing an expansion project set to be complete in Summer 2020 to add an additional 18,000 square feet, which will house objects from its collection, host events, and create social gathering spaces. The expansion project was designed by Weiss/Manfredi.

Notes

External links
The Baker Museum official website

Art museums and galleries in Florida
Modern art museums in the United States
Museums in Collier County, Florida
Buildings and structures in Naples, Florida
Art museums established in 2000
2000 establishments in Florida